María Hilaria Domínguez Arvizu (born 12 June 1953) is a Mexican politician affiliated with the Institutional Revolutionary Party. As of 2014 she served as Deputy of the L and LIX Legislatures of the Mexican Congress representing Nayarit.

References

1953 births
Living people
Politicians from Nayarit
Women members of the Chamber of Deputies (Mexico)
Members of the Chamber of Deputies (Mexico)
Institutional Revolutionary Party politicians
21st-century Mexican politicians
21st-century Mexican women politicians
National Autonomous University of Mexico alumni
Members of the Congress of Nayarit
20th-century Mexican politicians
20th-century Mexican women politicians